Deidre Behar (born October 29, 1988) is an American writer, producer and host for Entertainment Tonight. In 2012, Behar joined Defy Media's Clevver Media as a host, producer and writer. She regularly appeared with Katie Krause. With Clevver, Behar created original programming, singular video news stories and daily entertainment shows. During this time, Clevver Media ranked in the top 10 YouTube networks. She has also produced content for Reelz.

Behar attended Loyola Marymount University (LMU) in Los Angeles, California. While at LMU, she was an anchor and a correspondent at the school. After college, Behar worked as an entertainment reporter for Fox.

References

External links
Deidre Behar on Twitter
Deidre Behar on Facebook

Loyola Marymount University alumni
Living people
1988 births
People from Los Angeles
American television reporters and correspondents
American people of Cuban descent
Journalists from California
American women non-fiction writers
American women television journalists
21st-century American women